Kharsang is a circle under the Miao sub-division of Changlang district of Arunachal Pradesh. The inhabitants of the district are mainly Tangsa tribe. Tea plantations being the main source of  income for the locals. Surrounded by beautiful hills, rivers and greenery it has the potential to be a tourist hotspot if the resources are used efficiently. The area is also rich in minerals such as coal and petroleum, it has an oil field under Geo-Enpro Petroleum Ltd. spread over an area of 11 square km.

Connectivity
The nearest airport is 135 km, situated at Mohanbari in Dibrugarh district of the neighbouring state of Assam. The nearest railway station is at Ledo in Assam. The town is connected by road to the district headquarters at Changlang and is 140 km by road from Dibrugarh which is the nearest big city. A proposal to extent broad gauge railway track from Ledo to Kharsang through Lekhapani was on and survey was announced in 2009 railway budget.

Cities and towns in Changlang district